Héctor Eugene Méndez (1 August 1897 – 13 December 1977) was an Argentine welterweight professional boxer who competed in the 1920s. He won a silver medal at the 1924 Summer Olympics, losing against Jean DeLarge in the final bout. Héctor was the flag bearer for his country at the opening ceremony of the 1928 Summer Olympics.

References

External links
Héctor Méndez's obituary 
Héctor Méndez's profile at Sports Reference.com

1897 births
1977 deaths
Boxers at the 1924 Summer Olympics
Olympic boxers of Argentina
Olympic silver medalists for Argentina
Welterweight boxers
Place of birth missing
Olympic medalists in boxing
Argentine male boxers
Medalists at the 1924 Summer Olympics